
Gmina Kijewo Królewskie is a rural gmina (administrative district) in Chełmno County, Kuyavian-Pomeranian Voivodeship, in north-central Poland.

Villages
Gmina Kijewo Królewskie contains the villages and settlements of Bągart, Bajerze, Brzozowo, Dorposz Szlachecki, Kiełp, Kijewo Królewskie, Kijewo Szlacheckie, Płutowo, Szymborno, Trzebcz Królewski, Trzebcz Szlachecki and Watorowo.

Neighbouring gminas
Gmina Kijewo Królewskie is bordered by the town of Chełmno and by the gminas of Chełmno, Chełmża, Łubianka, Papowo Biskupie, Stolno and Unisław.

References
Polish official population figures 2006

Kijewo Krolewskie
Chełmno County